James Child Drury Jr. (April 18, 1934 – April 6, 2020) was an American actor. He is best known for having played the title role in the 90-minute weekly Western television series The Virginian, which was broadcast on NBC from 1962 to 1971.

Early years
Drury was born in New York City, the son of James Child Drury and Beatrice Crawford Drury. His father was a New York University professor of marketing. He grew up between New York City and Salem, Oregon, where his mother owned a farm. Drury contracted polio at the age of 10.

He studied drama at New York University and took additional classes at UCLA to complete his degree after he began acting in films at MGM.

Career
Drury's professional acting career began when he was 12 years old, when he performed in a road company's production of Life with Father.

He signed a film contract with MGM in 1954 and appeared in bit parts in films. After he went to 20th Century Fox, he appeared in Love Me Tender (1956) and Bernardine (1957).

In 1959, Drury was cast as Harding, Jr., in the episode "Murder at the Mansion" on Richard Diamond, Private Detective. On May 9, 1959, early in his career, Drury appeared as Neal Adams in the episode "Client Neal Adams" of ABC's Western series Black Saddle.

On Christmas Eve 1959, Drury appeared in "Ten Feet of Nothing" on the syndicated anthology series, Death Valley Days, hosted by Stanley Andrews. Drury portrayed a young miner, Joe Plato.

In 1960, Drury appeared in different roles in two episodes, "Fair Game" and "Vindication", of another ABC Western series, The Rebel, starring Nick Adams as a Confederate adventurer roaming through the post-Civil War American West. On November 16, 1960, Drury played young pioneer Justin Claiborne in the episode "The Bleymier Story" of NBC's Wagon Train. He was also cast in the 1960 Disney movie, Pollyanna as George Dodds, the love interest of Nancy Olson.

In 1960, Drury portrayed Joe Darle in the episode "Wall of Silence" of the ABC/Warner Bros. detective series, Bourbon Street Beat. He made a guest appearance on the CBS drama series Perry Mason in 1961 in the role of musician and defendant Eddy King in "The Case of the Missing Melody".

He appeared in secondary roles for Disney. In 1962, he was cast in a substantial role as a lascivious gold prospector in the early Sam Peckinpah Western Ride the High Country (1962) opposite Randolph Scott and Joel McCrea.  On April 11, 1962, Drury played the title role in an episode of Wagon Train, "The Cole Crawford Story", (S5, E28).

Around the same time, Drury landed the top-billed leading role of the ranch foreman on The Virginian, a lavish series that ran for nine seasons until 1971. Drury was put under a 7-year contract with Universal in 1962, and was the front-runner for the role, but he still had to audition three separate times and was required to lose 30 pounds in 30 days to secure the part. Drury reported that he had based his performance of the Virginian on character elements of his maternal grandfather, with whom he had spent much of his childhood.

Drury and his Wilshire Boulevard Buffalo Hunters band performed 54 USO-sponsored shows for troops in Vietnam in three weeks in April 1966.

Drury continued his title role in The Virginian after it was reformatted as The Men from Shiloh on NBC (1970–1971). He had the lead role of Captain Spike Ryerson in the drama series Firehouse on ABC television in 1974.

In 1993, Drury had a guest-starring role as Captain Tom Price on the first three episodes of Walker, Texas Ranger, opposite Chuck Norris and Clarence Gilyard. Drury also had a cameo role in the 2000 TV movie of The Virginian starring Bill Pullman. The film followed Wister's novel more closely than had the television series. Drury appeared in a number of films and other television programs, including The Young Warriors and the TV cowboy reunion movie The Gambler Returns: The Luck of the Draw with Doug McClure, who played the character Trampas on The Virginian.

In 1991, Drury was inducted into the Hall of Great Western Performers at the National Cowboy & Western Heritage Museum in Oklahoma City. In 1997 and 2003, he was a guest at the Western Film Fair in Charlotte, North Carolina.

Personal life and death
On February 7, 1957, Drury married Cristall Othones, and fathered two sons, Timothy and James III. The couple divorced on November 23, 1964, and on April 27, 1968, he married Phyllis Jacqueline Mitchell; the marriage ended in divorce on January 30, 1979. His third marriage was to Carl Ann Head on July 30, 1979; it lasted until her death on August 25, 2019. Drury had three stepchildren from his previous marriages, a stepdaughter, Rhonda Brown, and two stepsons, Frederick Drury and Gary Schero. His son, Timothy Drury, is a keyboardist, guitarist, and vocalist who has played with the rock groups Eagles and Whitesnake.

Drury supported Barry Goldwater in the 1964 United States presidential election.

Drury was in the oil and natural gas business in Houston in the late 20th century.

Drury died from natural causes on April 6, 2020, just 12 days short of his 86th birthday.

Filmography

Film

Television

Narrator 
River Invaders: The Scourge of Zebra Mussels (1994) — PBS special — host/narrator
Sturgeon: Ancient Survivors of the Deep (1995) — PBS special — host/narrator
A Vanishing Melody: The Call of the Piping Plover (1997) — PBS special

References

External links
James Drury: The Virginian Official Website

The Virginian Website
Picture of Drury in Oregon
Interview with Kirby Jonas and James Drury
Actor James Drury tells of next generation Virginian, newsok.com, June 26, 2014; accessed June 21, 2017. 
 Interview with James Drury at Classic Film & TV Cafe
 

1934 births
2020 deaths
20th-century American male actors
21st-century American businesspeople
American male film actors
American male television actors
Businesspeople from Texas
Male Western (genre) film actors
Male actors from Houston
Male actors from Los Angeles
Male actors from New York City
Male actors from Salem, Oregon
People with polio
Western (genre) television actors